The 2012–13 Ugandan Super League was the 46th season of the official Ugandan football championship, the top-level football league of Uganda.

Overview
For an eight-month period in the 2012–13  season, Uganda had two parallel leagues structures, the Federation of Uganda Football Associations (FUFA) Super League, run by the national Federation, and the Uganda Super League which was managed by the Uganda Super League Limited (USLL).

Uganda's cabinet chaired by the Prime Minister Patrick Amama Mbabazi on 8 May 2013 declared that only one league would exist for the 2013/14 season.

FUFA Super League
The 2012–13 FUFA Super League was contested by 16 teams and was won by Kampala City Council FC, while Victors FC, Aurum Roses and Water FC were relegated.

Participants and locations

Some of the Kampala clubs may on occasions also play home matches at the Mandela National Stadium.

League standings

Leading goalscorer
The top goalscorer in the 2012–13 season was Herman Wasswa of SC Villa and Kampala City Council FC with 20 goals.

Uganda Super League Limited
The 2012–13 Ugandan Super League Ltd (USLL) was contested by 11 teams and was won by Maroons FC.

League standings

References

External links
 Uganda - List of Champions - RSSSF (Hans Schöggl)
 Ugandan Football League Tables - League321.com
 Uganda Premier League 2012/13 - Betstudy
 Uganda Premier League 2012/13 - SoccerPunter
 Uganda Premier League 2012/13 - Soccerway
 Uganda Super League 2012/13 - Futaa
 Uganda Super League 2012/13 - SoccerVista
 Uganda Super League 2012/13 - TablesLeague
 Uganda Super League (USL)
 Uganda Super League Ltd 2012/13 LOGS - SuperSport

Ugandan Super League seasons
Uganda Super League
Super League